Samuel Yakovlevich Pokrass (Самуил Яковлевич Покрасс) (1894 in Kiev – June 15, 1939 in New York City) was a Soviet composer of Ukrainian and Jewish origin. In 1920, during the Russian Civil War, he and the poet P. Grigoryev wrote fighting songs for the Red Army, including "White Army, Black Baron." That song's melody was used for the song Die Arbeiter von Wien ("The Workers of Vienna") in Red Vienna.

Pokrass later emigrated to the United States, where he worked as a composer in Hollywood from 1934 to 1939, and was known primarily for the musical film The Three Musketeers.

References
A. V. Shilov, Из истории первых советских песен (1917–24), М., 1963
A. Sokhor,  Как начиналась советская музыка, "МЖ", 1967, No 2.

External links

Samuel Pokrass in the Russian Wikipedia

1894 births
1939 deaths
Musicians from Kyiv
People from Kievsky Uyezd
Jewish Ukrainian musicians
Jewish composers
Soviet composers
Soviet male composers
20th-century composers
People of the Russian Civil War
Soviet emigrants to the United States